"I Don't Live Today" is a song by the Jimi Hendrix Experience, released  on their debut album Are You Experienced (1967). In a 1968 interview, Hendrix said it "was dedicated to the American-Indian and all minority depression groups". The song was part of the Experience concert repertoire and Hendrix often repeated the dedication during his introductions.

Recording
The song was recorded by the Experience in London during the sessions for Are You Experienced. Scheduling conflicts at Olympic Studios led manager Chas Chandler to book time at De Lane Lea Studios.  There they recorded "I Don't Live Today", which featured a manual wah effect that predated the pedal unit. They completed a working master by the end of the day, though Hendrix eventually recorded a new lead vocal at Olympic.

Composition and lyrics
Musicologist Ritchie Unterberger considers the lyrics to "I Don't Live Today" to be more at home in a gothic rock setting than in psychedelia, however; he describes the music as being "played and sung with an ebullience that belies the darkness of the lyrics." Author Sean Egan wrote that Hendrix "superbly, and with great economy of words evok[ed] despair, whether that despair be an individual's or the despair of a devastated and brutalized race." The song's tribal rhythms served as a platform for Hendrix's innovative guitar feedback improvisations. In honor of his Cherokee heritage, Hendrix dedicated the song to the American Indians and other minority groups.

Notes 
Citations

References
 
 
 

 
 

The Jimi Hendrix Experience songs
Songs about suicide
Songs written by Jimi Hendrix
1967 songs
Song recordings produced by Chas Chandler